Anne Catherine Case, Lady Deaton, (born July 27, 1958) is an American economist who is currently the Alexander Stewart 1886 Professor of Economics and Public Affairs, Emeritus, at Princeton University.

Early life and career 
She graduated from University at Albany, SUNY in 1980 and obtained a Master of Public Affairs from Princeton University in 1983, followed by a Ph.D from the university in 1988. After working as an assistant professor at Department of Economics at Harvard University 1988-1991, she has worked at Department of Economics, Princeton University and Woodrow Wilson School of Public and International Affairs since 1991, becoming a professor in 1997 and the Alexander Stewart 1886 Professor of Economics and Public Affairs in 2007. She currently serves as the Alexander Stewart 1886 Professor of Economics and Public Affairs Emeritus (effective as of July 1, 2017).

Her research fields include labor economics, health economics and development studies. Her research has led to the discovery that midlife mortality rates have increased for white, non-Hispanics in the U.S. with a high school diploma or less, while midlife mortality rates in other rich countries have fallen. She attributes rise in mortality rates to drugs, alcohol, and suicide, also known as "deaths of despair."

Awards 
In 2003, she received the Kenneth J. Arrow Award in health economics. She became a Fellow of the Econometric Society in 2009, a Research Fellow at the  Institute for the Study of Labor (IZA) in 2012, and a member of the American Academy of Arts and Sciences, the American Philosophical Society, and the National Academy of Medicine in 2017. In 2016, she received the National Academy of Sciences Cozzarelli Prize for her work on U.S. morbidity and mortality. Case was appointed to a three year term as a member of the President's Committee on the National Medal of Science, as well as the Committee on National Statistics. "The committee consists of 12 scientists and engineers appointed by the President to evaluate nominees for the Medal, which is given to individuals who have made outstanding contributions to knowledge in the physical, biological, mathematical, engineering, social and behavioral sciences." Case was elected as a member of the National Academy of Sciences in 2020.

Publications

2017 
Case, A., and T-N. Coates. 2017. “Fear and Despair: Consequences of Inequity.” Chapter 1 in Knowledge to Action. New York: Oxford University Press. Publisher's Version
Case, A., and A.Deaton. 2017. “Suicide, age, and wellbeing: an empirical investigation.” NBER Working Paper 21279, Chapter 10 (pages 307-34) in Insights in the Economics of Aging. Chicago: University of Chicago Press.
Case, Anne, and Angus Deaton. 2017. “Mortality and Morbidity in the 21st Century.” Brookings Papers on Economic Activity, Spring 2017.

2016 
Ardington, C., T. Barnighausen, A. Case, and A. Menendez. 2016. “Social protection and labor market outcomes in youth in South Africa.” Industrial and Labor Relations Review 69 (2): 455-470.

2015 
Ardington, C., and A. Case. 2015. “Health Challenges Past and Future.” Chapter 41 in The Oxford Companion to the Economics of South Africa. Oxford, UK: Oxford University Press.
Case, A., and A.Deaton. 2015. “Rising morbidity and mortality in midlife among white non-Hispanic Americans in the 21st century.” Proceedings of the National Academy of Sciences 112 (49): 15078-15083. Publisher's Version

2014 
Ardington, C., T. Barnighausen, A. Case, and A. Menendez. 2014. “The Economic Consequences of AIDS Mortality in South Africa.” Journal of Development Economics 111: 48-60.

2013 
Case, A., and C. Paxson. 2013. “HIV Risk and Adolescent Behaviors in Africa.” American Economic Review Papers and Proceedings 103 (3): 433-438.
Case, A., A. Garib, A. Menendez, and A. Olgiati. 2013. “Paying the Piper: The High Cost of Funerals in South Africa.” Economic Development and Cultural Change 62 (1): 1-20.

2011 
Case, A., and C. Paxson. 2011. “The impact of AIDS pandemic on health services in Africa: Evidence from demographic health surveys.” Demography 48 (2): 675-697.
Case, A., and A. Menendez. 2011. “Requiescat in Pace? The Consequences of High Priced Funerals in South Africa.” Chapter 11 in Explorations of Aging . Chicago : University of Chicago Press.
Case, A., and A. Paxson. 2011. “The Long Reach of Childhood Health and Circumstance: Evidence from the Whitehall II Study.” The Economic Journal 121: F183-F204.

2010 
Ardington, C., A. Case, and M. Islam. 2010. “The impact of AIDS on intergenerational support in South Africa: Evidence from the Cape Area Panel Study.” Research on Aging 32 (1): 97-121.
Ardington, C., and A. Case. 2010. “Interactions Between Mental Health and Socioeconomic Status in the South African National Income Dynamics Study.” Studies in Economics and Econometrics 34 (3): 69-85.
Case, A., and C. Paxson. 2010. “Causes and Consequences of Early Life Health.” Demography 47 (Supplement): S65-S85.

2009 
Case, A., and C. Paxson. 2009. “Early Life Health and Cognitive Function in Old Age.” American Economic Review Papers and Proceedings 99 (2): 104-109.
Ardington, C., A. Case, and V. Hosegood. 2009. “Labor supply responses to large social transfers: Longitudinal evidence from South Africa.” American Economic Journal: Applied Economics 1 (1): 22-48.
Case, A., C. Paxson, and M. Islam. 2009. “Making Sense of the Labor Market Height Premium: Evidence from the British Household Panel Survey.” Economic Letters 102: 174-176.
Case, A., and A. Menendez. 2009. “Sex Differences in Obesity Rates in Poor Countries: Evidence from South Africa.” Economics and Human Biology 7 (3): 271-282.

Personal life 
She is married to Nobel laureate Angus Deaton, with whom she has co-authored several papers.

References

External links 
Anne Case at Google Scholar

Living people
1958 births
Labor economists
Princeton University faculty
21st-century American economists
20th-century American economists
University at Albany, SUNY alumni
Princeton School of Public and International Affairs alumni
Place of birth missing (living people)
Fellows of the Econometric Society
American women economists
Members of the American Philosophical Society
Fellows of the American Academy of Arts and Sciences
Sloan Research Fellows
Members of the National Academy of Medicine
Members of the United States National Academy of Sciences
20th-century American women
21st-century American women
Wives of knights